Tikri may refer to:

 Tikri, Gurgaon, a village in Haryana, India
 Tikri, Uttar Pradesh, in India
 Tikri, Amethi, a village in Uttar Pradesh, India
 Tikri, Pakistan
 Tikri Valley